Events in 2012 in Japanese music.

Events
 26th Japan Gold Disc Award
 January 20 – 3rd CD Shop Awards
 June 23 – 2012 MTV Video Music Awards Japan 
 October 7 – 6th Animax Anison Grand Prix
 November 14 – 45th Japan Cable Awards
 November 22 – 45th Best Hits Kayosai
 December 5 – 2012 FNS Music Festival
 December 6 – 45th Japan Lyricist Awards
 December 30 – 54th Japan Record Awards

Charts
List of number-one albums of 2012 (Japan)
List of Oricon number-one singles of 2012 
List of Hot 100 number-one singles of 2012 (Japan)
List of number-one digital singles of 2012 (Japan)

Best-sellers

Artists
The following is a list of the five best-selling music artists in Japan in 2016 by value of sales, including sales of records and of DVDs and Blu-rays, according to Oricon.

Albums
The following is a list of the top ten best-selling albums in Japan in 2016, according to Oricon.

Debuting artists
 Soloists debuting

 Misaki Iwasa
 Leo Ieiri
 Yūki Kaji
 Nagi Yanagi
 Mayu Watanabe
 Ray
 Daisuke Kishio
 Aoi Yūki
 Tomohisa Sako
 Alma Kaminiito
 Mikako Komatsu
 Konomi Suzuki
 Ayana Taketatsu
 Kana Hanazawa
 Nobuhiko Okamoto
 Rino Sashihara
 Kavka Shishido
 Luna Haruna
 Mai Aizawa
 Machico
 Erena Ono
 Takuma Terashima
 Rina Sumioka
 Kanako Tahara
 Yui Ogura
 Mariko Gotō
 Yumi Hara
 Yutaro Miura
 Sachika Misawa
 Kanako Takatsuki
 Sayoko Izumi
 Zaq
 Sakiko Matsui
 Sayoko Izumi
 Yoshino Nanjō
 Yunchi
 Tomomi Kasai
 Fuku Suzuki
 Shiori Niiyama
 Tia

 Groups debuting

 Returning from hiatus

 Kobukuro
 Koda Kumi
 Rag Fair
 Tomomi Kahara
 Brief & Trunks
 T-Bolan

Disbanding in 2012
Disbanding

 GO!GO!7188
 Tokyo Jihen
 Serial TV Drama
 SDN48
 Doping Panda
 School Food Punishment
 Stereopony

 Going on hiatus

 Yashiki Takajin
 Remioromen
 Saasa
 Dream Morning Musume
 Chemistry
 Elephant Kashimashi
 Yui
 Nozomi Ōhashi

See also
 2012 in Japan
 2012 in Japanese television
 List of Japanese films of 2012

References